Daniel Yecid Peñaloza Cárdenas (born 14 May 2002) known as Daniel Peñaloza is a Colombian footballer. He plays as a forward for Tigres FC in Colombia.

Peñaloza was born in Bogotá. On 30 April 2017, he made his debut for the Tigres F.C. first team against América de Cali in the Categoría Primera A at 14 years old. He replaced thirty-nine-year-old Wilson Carpintero as a substitute in the 80th minute.

References 

2002 births
Tigres F.C. footballers
Colombian footballers
Living people
Association football forwards
Footballers from Bogotá